Lorenzo Carboncini (born 22 September 1976) is an Italian rower who has competed at four Olympic Games.

Biography
His best result came at the 2000 Summer Olympics, where he won the silver medal as part of the Italian men's coxless four.  Before that in 1996, he competed in the men's coxed eight at the Olympics, finishing in 9th place.  In 2008 he competed as part of the men's coxless four again, this time finishing in 11th.  In 2012 he was part of the men's pair with Niccolo Mornati.  They finished in fourth place.

He works as a police officer and enjoys basketball, golf and music.

References

External links
 

1976 births
Living people
Italian male rowers
People from Empoli
Rowers at the 1996 Summer Olympics
Rowers at the 2000 Summer Olympics
Rowers at the 2008 Summer Olympics
Rowers at the 2012 Summer Olympics
Olympic silver medalists for Italy
Olympic rowers of Italy
Olympic medalists in rowing
World Rowing Championships medalists for Italy
Medalists at the 2000 Summer Olympics
Rowers of Fiamme Oro
Sportspeople from the Metropolitan City of Florence